Robert "Bobby" Duffy (born Dublin died January 1992) was an Irish football player.

He played for St James's Gate F.C., Shamrock Rovers F.C. and Drumcondra as a forward.

He won his only senior cap and also scored for Ireland on 10 May 1950 in a 5-1 defeat to Belgium in Brussels.

References

Association footballers from County Dublin
Republic of Ireland association footballers
Republic of Ireland international footballers
Ireland (FAI) international footballers
Shamrock Rovers F.C. players
Drumcondra F.C. players
St James's Gate F.C. players
League of Ireland players
Year of birth missing
1992 deaths
League of Ireland XI players
Association football forwards